Cytoplasmic linker associated protein 2, also known as CLASP2, is a protein which in humans is encoded by the CLASP2 gene.

References

External links

Further reading